Cilla's World is the title of Cilla Black's thirteenth solo studio album. It was a concept album themed around sixteen original children's songs about animals, green issues and the environment recorded specifically for the Australian music market (Black's second most successful music market in the world).

Sold on the idea of such an unusual concept, Black agreed to go ahead with the album that featured primarily songs co-written by Play School TV presenter Don Spencer. The recording sessions were held at AIR Studios in London and although produced by Ron Edwards were supervised by Black's former producer George Martin.

The project was independently produced by the music company MCA/Gilbey and released by Virgin in Australia, which produced the album's packaging from recycled paper.

In 1993, the album was given a release in Great Britain by Silva Screen Records.

Track listing
 "The (Solar Powered, Practical, Combustible, Compatible, Responsibly Recyclable) Machine"
 "Don't Argue with an Elephant"
 "A Little More Green"
 "ABC of the World"
 "Penguin Strut"
 "Rain"
 "Trees"
 "Eggs"
 "Panda"
 "Personality"
 "Weather Song"
 "Sunshine Medley"
 "Please Don't Call Me a Koala Bear"
 "Let's Hear it for Skin"
 "The End of the Day"
 "Goodnight"

Credits
Personnel
 Lead vocals by Cilla Black
 Produced and arranged by Rod Edwards
 Engineered by Lance Phillips, Rupert Coulson & Geoff Foster
 Executive producers: Chris Gilbey and Joanne Peterson

References

External links
 CillaBlack.com Discography – Cilla's World
 
 Cilla Black - Cilla's World (1990) album review, credits & releases at AllMusic
 Cilla Black - Cilla's World (1990) album releases & credits at Discogs

Further reading
 

1990 albums
Cilla Black albums
Virgin Records albums
Silva Screen Records albums
Albums recorded at AIR Studios